Broad Mouth Branch is a  long 1st order tributary to the Deep River in Randolph, North Carolina.  This is the only stream with this name in the United States according to the US Geological Survey.

Course
Broad Mouth Branch rises in a pond on the Back Branch divide about 2.5 miles northeast of Coleridge, North Carolina in Randolph County, North Carolina and then flows southwesterly to join the Deep River about 1 mile north of Coleridge, North Carolina.

Watershed
Broad Mouth Branch drains  of area, receives about 47.3 in/year of precipitation, and has a wetness index of 383.09 and is about 50% forested.

See also
List of rivers of North Carolina

References

Rivers of North Carolina
Rivers of Randolph County, North Carolina